Edward Lee Spence (born November 1947) is a pioneer in underwater archaeology who studies shipwrecks and sunken treasure. He is also a published editor and author of non-fiction reference books; a magazine editor (Diving World, Atlantic Coastal Diver, Treasure, Treasure Diver, and Treasure Quest), and magazine publisher (ShipWrecks, Wreck Diver); and a published photographer. Spence was twelve years old when he found his first five shipwrecks.

Spence's past work has been funded by such institutions as the Savannah Ships of the Sea Museum, the College of Charleston, the South Carolina Committee for the Humanities and the National Endowment for the Humanities. In 1991 and 1992, Spence served as Chief of Underwater Archeology for San Andres y Providencia, a 40,000 square-mile, Colombian-owned archipelago in the western Caribbean. He has worked on the wrecks of Spanish galleons, pirate ships, Great Lakes freighters, modern luxury liners (cruise ships), Civil War blockade runners and submarines.

Discoveries

H. L. Hunley 

Spence first reported the discovery of the Civil War submarine Hunley in 1970. Spence mapped and reported its location to numerous government agencies. The July 2007 cover story in U.S. News & World Report noted that the Hunley "disappeared without a trace" until 1970 when it was found by "underwater archaeologist E. Lee Spence." That report made no mention of novelist Clive Cussler, whose organization later (August 2008) dropped a lawsuit in federal district court against Spence in which it had claimed that they and not Spence had discovered the wreck in 1995. Both sides still claim that they and not the other discovered the wreck.

On September 13, 1976, the National Park Service submitted Sea Research Society's (Spence's) location for H.L. Hunley for inclusion on the National Register of Historic Places. Spence's location for Hunley became a matter of public record when H.L. Hunley's placement on that list was officially approved on December 29, 1978.

Spence's book Treasures of the Confederate Coast, which had a chapter on his discovery of Hunley and included a map complete with an "X" showing the wreck's location was published in January 1995.

In 1995 the discovery was independently verified by a combined South Carolina Institute of Archaeology and Anthropology (SCIAA) and National Underwater and Marine Agency (NUMA) expedition directed by SCIAA underwater archaeologist Mark M. Newell and funded in part by novelist Clive Cussler. Later the same year, at the official request of Senator Glenn F. McConnell (chairman), of the State of South Carolina Hunley Commission, Spence donated all of his rights to the shipwreck to the State.

The Hunley discovery was described by William Dudley, Director of Naval History at the Naval Historical Center as probably the most important (underwater archaeological) find of the (20th) century." The tiny submarine and its contents have been valued at over $40,000,000 making the discovery and donation one of the most significant and valuable contributions ever made to the State of South Carolina.

In 2016 the Naval History and Heritage Command published a detailed report on the history, discovery, and restoration of the Hunley entitled H. L. Hunley: Recovery Operations suggesting that it is most likely Spence found a nearby buried navigation buoy rather than the Hunley.

Other discoveries 

South Carolina's law protecting both the state's and the salvors' interests in shipwrecks was passed following Spence's discovery of the Georgiana and his company Shipwrecks Inc. was granted South Carolina State Salvage License #1.

Spence states he has salvaged over $50,000,000 in valuable artifacts and has been responsible, through his archival research, for the location of the wrecks of the side-paddle-wheel steamers Republic and Central America from which over one billion dollars in treasure has been recovered.

On April 4, 1989, Spence announced his discovery that Margaret Mitchell, who had claimed her Pulitzer Prize winning novel Gone with the Wind was pure fiction, had actually taken much of her compelling story of love, greed and war from real life and that Mitchell had actually based Rhett Butler on the life of George Alfred Trenholm, a tall, handsome, shipping magnate from Charleston, South Carolina, who had made millions of dollars from blockade running and was accused of making off with much of the Confederate treasury and had been thrown in prison after the Civil War. Spence's literary discovery that had its roots in his prior discoveries of some of Trenholm's wrecked blockade runners made international news.

The Encyclopedia Of Civil War Shipwrecks by W. Craig Gaines additionally credits Spence with the discoveries of the following Civil War wrecks: the Constance (lost 1864, found 1967);  (lost 1864, found 1970); Keokuk (lost 1863, found 1971); Minho (lost 1862, found 1965); Presto (lost 1864, found 1967); Ruby (lost 1863, found 1966); Stonewall Jackson (lost 1863, found 1965). Spence's own books, as well as numerous third party books, newspaper and magazine accounts, and archaeological reports describe his discoveries of the blockade runners Mary Bowers and Norseman and dozens of other ships of all types and nations in waters all over the world spanning a time period of over two thousand years.

In June 2013 Spence announced his discovery of the wreck of the SS Ozama, a steamer with a history of smuggling, which had been wrecked off the South Carolina coast in 1894.

Cartography 
Spence is also a cartographer and has published a number of popular and archaeological (proximal, contour and conformant) maps and charts dealing with historical events, archaeology, shipwrecks and treasure.
 Shipwrecks of Hilton Head & Vicinity chart by Lee Spence, (Shipwreck Press, Sullivan's Island, S.C., 1980) OCLC: 15281285
 Shipwrecks of Wreck Valley : [New York City and Long Island regions] chart by E. Lee Spence (Shipwreck Press, Sullivan's Island, SC, 1990) OCLC: 40228884
 Shipwrecks of the Civil War : Charleston, South Carolina, 1861-1865 map by E. Lee Spence, (Shipwreck Press, Sullivan's Island, S.C., 1984) OCLC: 11214217
 Spence's Chart of Shipwrecks of Charleston, S.C.: over 250 wrecks map by E. Lee Spence (Shipwreck Press, Sullivan's Island, S.C., 1980) OCLC: 40228884
 Gold Bug: Treasure Chart, Edgar A. Poe by E. Lee Spence, (Sullivan's Island, SC: E. Lee Spence, 1981) OCLC: 49829303
 South Carolina Shipwrecks, 1520-1776 by E. Lee Spence (Charleston, S.C. : E. Lee Spence, 1976) OCLC: 6270298

International Diving Institute 
Spence is a founder, owner, and Vice President of the International Diving Institute, one of fewer than a dozen schools in North America that teaches and certifies commercial deep sea divers.

Credentials and affiliations 
Current President and Chairman of the Board of the Sea Research Society, Spence is a past member of both the Board of Directors of the American Military Museum and Board of Directors of the Cardiovascular Research Institute of the Medical University of South Carolina in Charleston. He is a lifetime member of Mensa International and a former member of Intertel. Spence has an honorable discharge from the United States Army Reserve and has served as Commander and Vice Commander for Post #10 of the veteran's organization American Legion.

Education 
Spence graduated cum laude from the University of South Carolina in 1976, where he obtained a Bachelor of Arts Degree in Interdisciplinary Studies with an academic concentration in marine archaeology and won the Donald O. Bushman Award in cartography. His doctorate is a Doctor of Marine Histories (DMH) from Sea Research Society's College of Marine Arts.

Bibliography 
 The Hunley: Submarines, Sacrifice & Success in the Civil War by Mark Ragan (Narwhal Press, Charleston/Miami, 1995) 
 A Look at South Carolina's Underwater Heritage, by E. Lee Spence (Nelson Southern Printing, Charleston, South Carolina, 1974) OCLC: 11121049
 Treasures of the Confederate Coast: the "real Rhett Butler" & Other Revelations by Dr. E. Lee Spence, (Narwhal Press, Charleston/Miami, 1995) , OCLC: 32431590
 Shipwreck Encyclopedia of the Civil War: South Carolina & Georgia, 1861-1865 by Edward Lee Spence (Sullivan's Island, S.C., Shipwreck Press, 1991) OCLC: 24420089
 Shipwrecks of South Carolina and Georgia : (includes Spence's List, 1520-1865) by E. Lee Spence, Sullivan's Island, S.C. (Sullivan's Island 29482, Sea Research Society, 1984) OCLC 10593079
 Shipwrecks, Pirates & Privateers: Sunken Treasures of the Upper South Carolina Coast, 1521-1865 by E. Lee Spence, (Narwhal Press, Charleston/Miami, 1995) 
 Spence's Guide to South Carolina : diving, 639 shipwrecks (1520–1813), saltwater sport fishing, recreational shrimping, crabbing, oystering, clamming, saltwater aquarium, 136 campgrounds, 281 boat landings by E. Lee Spence, (Nelson Southern Printing, Sullivan's Island, S.C.: Spence, 1976) OCLC: 2846435
 Wreck of the Georgiana, mystery ship of the Confederacy by E. Lee Spence, (Sullivan's Island, S.C. : Shipwreck Press, 1988) OCLC: 50414449
 Shipwrecks of Charleston Harbor by E. Lee Spence (Sullivan's Island, SC : Shipwreck Press, 1980) OCLC: 6908900
 Shipwrecks of the Era of the Revolution : South Carolina & Georgia, 1763-1783 by E. Lee Spence, (Sullivan's Island, SC : Shipwreck Press Inc., 1991) OCLC: 39977318
 Shipwrecks: "the magazine" edited by E Lee Spence, (Sullivan's Island, SC: Shipwreck Press, 1989–1991, Narwhal Press 1995-) OCLC: 20784612
 On This Day(October 25, 1970) StarClique 
 Financial Times, London, "First Person: E. Lee Spence," July 19, 2008

References

External links 

 Comments about Spence and his work from critics and peers.
 Searches for Hunley, Cussler, Spence
 Sea Research Society links to Hunley
 The Hunley.com website dedicated to Hunley Link fails: see Talk page.
 Find Spence's books & maps in a library with WorldCat

1947 births
Living people
American archaeologists
American book editors
American encyclopedists
21st-century American historians
21st-century American male writers
American magazine editors
American photojournalists
American underwater divers
Treasure hunters
Underwater archaeologists
Maritime archaeology
Underwater photographers
Mensans
Writers from Charleston, South Carolina
Leon High School alumni
Historians from Florida
American male non-fiction writers